Sushmita Mukherjee is an Indian actress and author. She has starred in several Hindi movies and television shows.

She studied at Jesus and Mary College of the University of Delhi. She is an alumnus of National School of Drama passing out in 1983. Sushmita was married to the director Sudhir Mishra. After her divorce, she married the actor, producer, and civil activist Raja Bundela and has two children. Her book 'Baanjh: Incomplete Lives of Complete Women' which is a collection of 11 short stories released in January 2021. Currently, she is portraying the role of Kusum Mishra in Jagannath Aur Purvi Ki Dosti Anokhi at Sony TV. Currently, she is playing Rekha in Star Bharat show Meri Saas Bhoot Hai opposite Kajal Chauhan and Vibhav Roy.

Filmography

Films

TV serials

References

External links

Indian film actresses
Indian voice actresses
Living people
Actresses in Hindi cinema
Indian television actresses
Year of birth missing (living people)
Delhi University alumni
Actors from Mumbai
Indian writers